"Don't Turn Around" is the debut single by American soul/R&B vocal group Black Ivory. The song was written, produced, and arranged by record producer, Patrick Adams

Song information
Black Ivory's debut single, "Don't Turn Around", was released in April 1971. It is the title track from their debut album. The song entered the Billboard Soul singles chart in November 1971, peaking at No. 38 in January 1972. The single along with the B-side, "I Keep Asking You Questions", written by Black Ivory and Adams, was recorded at Sigma Sound Studio in Philadelphia, Pennsylvania.

Critical reception 
Andrew Hamilton, reviewing the album on AllMusic, described it as, "Black Ivory's first single was this hurtin' Patrick Adams ballad released by Today Records the spring of 1971. Leroy Burgess' sweet, innocent falsetto worms right into your heart as he tries to convince himself that an affair is over".

Covers and samples
In 1989, the Washington, D.C.-based go-go band E.U. covered, "Don't Turn Around" on their album, Livin' Large.

Rapper Raekwon sampled "I Keep Asking You Questions" for his song "Criminology", on his 1995 album, Only Built 4 Cuban Linx.

In 2010, Raekwon, Ghostface Killah and Method Man sampled, "I Keep Asking You Questions" on their single, "Criminology 2.5." from the album, Wu-Massacre.

Poet Wanda Robinson, on her album Black Ivory, used the instrumental track of "Don't Turn Around" as the background for her poem "The Final Hour" and "I Keep Asking You Questions" for her poem "Instant Replay." Robinson was Black Ivory's label mate at Today/Perception.

Personnel
Black Ivory
Leroy Burgess
Stuart Bascombe
Russell Patterson

Production
Produced, conducted and arranged by Patrick Adams
Vocal arrangements by Leroy Burgess
String arrangements on "If I Could Be A Mirror", by Leroy Burgess
"Don't Turn Around" / "I Keep Asking You Questions" (singles)
Patrick Adams, Robert Ayers: Piano
Val Burke: Bass
Norman Harris & Patrick Adams: Guitar
Arnold Ramsey: Drums
Vince Montana: Vibes
Larry Washington: Conga

References

1971 songs
1971 singles
Songs written by Patrick Adams (musician)